John Yorke (1728–1801) was an English barrister and politician who sat in the House of Commons from 1753 to 1784.

Life
Yorke was the fourth son of Philip Yorke, 1st Earl of Hardwicke and his wife Margaret Cocks. Educated at Newcome's School, he matriculated at Corpus Christi College, Cambridge in 1746, graduating M.A. in 1749. Admitted to Lincoln's Inn in 1746, he was called to the bar in 1754.

Yorke held a number of legal sinecures, secured for him by his father as Lord Chancellor. In practice he neglected the House of Commons, is not known to have spoken there, and lived much with his parents at Wimpole. He transferred in 1768 to the  seat, which his brother Charles had given up, and retired as Member of Parliament in 1784.

Yorke owned The Cedars, a prominent house in Sunninghill, Berkshire. He sold the house to the antiquary George Ellis.

Family

Yorke married Elizabeth Lygon (b. 1742, d. 1766), the only daughter of Reginald Lygon of Madresfield. They had one daughter, Jemima Yorke (b. 1763, d. 16 Jul 1804), she married Reginald Pole Carew.

Notes

1728 births
1801 deaths
People educated at Newcome's School
Alumni of Corpus Christi College, Cambridge
Members of Lincoln's Inn
English barristers
Members of the Parliament of Great Britain for English constituencies
British MPs 1747–1754
British MPs 1754–1761
British MPs 1761–1768
British MPs 1768–1774
British MPs 1774–1780
British MPs 1780–1784
People from Wimpole
Younger sons of earls
Lords of the Admiralty